Humac is an uninhabited hamlet on the island of Hvar, Croatia. It is connected by the D116 highway.

It is a very old village where man had been living for centuries. There are many simple houses made of stone in its surroundings called trim, built without binder in a way that they become narrower towards the top. Many of them have their original foundations from early Stone Age. 

Inhabitants of Humac have been occupied with cattle and wine growing for thousands years, and in around 1950 they started growing lavender. In the last few centuries people didn't live in Humac (while living in village Vrisnik), but spent time in Humac during major agrarian works. 

These days village is brought to life only once a year, on St. John and Paul's day, patron saints of Humac, which is 26 June and when inhabitants return to their roots. On other days there is only Tavern "Humac" (Konoba "Humac" in Croatian) working most of days with vegetables from eco-gardens and meal cooked old style.

There is also old church, available for sightseeing. On some days there are sightseeings of Grapčeva cave, which is 40 minute from Humac. This is a typical cave in Dalmatian rocks with beautiful stalactites and stalagmites and represents one of the most important archaeological sites in Croatia.

References

External links 

Hvar
Former populated places in Croatia